Baku, the capital of Azerbaijan, receives 2.5 million tourists a year. According to Ilya Umansky, vice president of the Association of Tour Operators of Russia, Baku has become a more popular tourist destination in recent years.

Tourist attractions

Theatres

Cinemas

Concert Halls

Parks

Museums

Reserves

Galleries

See also
 Tourism in Azerbaijan

References

External links

 

 
Baku
Baku
Tourist attractions